Transcription refers to the process of converting sounds (voice, music etc.) into letters or musical notes, or producing a copy of something in another medium, including:

Genetics
 Transcription (biology), the copying of DNA into RNA, often the first step in gene expression
 Abortive transcription, the generation of very short RNA transcripts which are not used and rapidly degraded
 Bacterial transcription, the generation of RNA transcripts of the genetic material in bacteria
 Eukaryotic transcription, the process of copying the genetic information stored in DNA into RNA in eukaryotes
 Reverse transcription, the process of copying the genetic information stored in RNA into DNA in viruses
 Transcription (journal), an academic journal about genetics
 Transcription factor, a protein that controls the rate of transcription of genetic information from DNA to messenger RNA

Music
 Transcription (music), notating, converting musical sound into visual musical notes (for any purpose)
 Piano transcription, a common type of music transcription
 Transcription disc, a sound recording made during broadcasting for internal use by the broadcasting organization

Speech transcription
The process of converting spoken words into text, such as in:
linguistics
 Transcription (linguistics), the representations of speech or signing in written form
 Orthographic transcription, a transcription method that employs the standard spelling system of each target language
 Phonetic transcription, the representation of specific speech sounds or sign components
service and software
 Transcription (service), a service or business that converts speech into text
 Transcription (software), software that aids the conversion of speech into text
other
 Medical transcription, the process of converting a health professional's voice-recorded comments into a text document

Other
 Transcription (novel), a 2018 novel by Kate Atkinson

See also
 Transcript (disambiguation)